The London metropolitan area is the metropolitan area of London, England. It has several definitions, including the London Travel to Work Area, and usually consists of the London urban area, settlements that share London's infrastructure, and places from which it is practicable to commute to work in London. It is also known as the London commuter belt, or Southeast metropolitan area.

, before Brexit, the London metropolitan area was the most populated metropolis in the European Union with a population of approximately 14,763,521.

Scope
The boundaries are not fixed; they expand as transport options improve and affordable housing moves further away from the city centre. The belt currently covers much of the South East region and part of the East of England region, including the home counties of Hertfordshire, Buckinghamshire, Berkshire, Surrey, Kent and Essex, and, by several definitions, Hampshire, West Sussex, East Sussex, Bedfordshire & Northamptonshire.

The resident population of Greater London and those counties (partly) within the Metropolitan Green Belt was 18,868,800 in 2011. Much of the undeveloped part of this area lies within the designated belt, which, save as to existing buildings, yards and gardens, covers nearly all of Surrey, eastern Berkshire, southern Buckinghamshire, southern and mid Hertfordshire, southern Bedfordshire, south-west Essex, and western Kent. Largely in these counties, three Areas of Outstanding Natural Beauty (the Chiltern Hills, Surrey Hills and North Downs AONBs) surrounding the Thames basin are within the commuter belt.

Definitions

Travel to work area

The London travel to work area, defined by the Office for National Statistics as the area for which "of the resident economically active population, at least 75% actually work in the area, and also, that of everyone working in the area, at least 75% actually live in the area." has a population of 9,294,800 (2005 estimate).

Environs of Greater London
There are 17 local government districts that share a boundary with Greater London, in the East and South East regions. Most districts are entirely, or have sections, within the M25 motorway or are within  of Charing Cross.

Adjacent districts often share characteristics of Outer London, such as forming part of the continuous urban sprawl, being served by the London Underground, being covered by the London telephone area code, (until 2000) forming part of the Metropolitan Police District and having a relatively high employed population working in London.

London's Larger Urban Zone
Larger Urban Zone is a definition created in 2004 by Eurostat that measures the population and expanse of metropolitan areas across European countries. Based on the 2001 census, the population of London's Larger Urban Zone was 11.9 million, ranking it as the most populous metropolitan area in the European Union until Brexit. The districts that are considered parts of this Larger Urban Zone are listed here: (no district in Bedfordshire, Hampshire, or Sussex is included).  Several large conurbations fall just outside the zone: Reading, Luton, High Wycombe and significant parts of the Aldershot and Crawley Urban Areas.

Urban areas within the commuter belt

The following table lists urban areas (also known as built-up areas) considered part of the London Commuter Belt with populations over 20,000. The commuter belt contains all urban areas within an approximate 40 mile (64 km) radius of Charing Cross. Some of the outermost towns include Aylesbury, Reading, Aldershot and Maidstone.

Outer commuter belt
Some estate agents, including James Pendleton and Savills, have defined a 'second commuter belt' further away from London. The definition includes places up to approximately 55 miles (89 km) from central London, including Oxford, Hastings, Margate, Milton Keynes and Brighton.

See also
 Greater London Built-up Area
 Stockbroker Belt
 Home counties
 List of metropolitan areas in the United Kingdom

References

External links
Calculator for commuter travel times to London from the Home Counties
London Travel to Work Area mapped with others

Geography of London
Greater London
Belt regions
Metropolitan areas of England
Regions of England
South East England